Ujwang'a is a village in Sihay sublocation, East Ward North East location, Ugenya Constituency, Siaya County, Kenya. It is endowed with sweet rice fields where tonnes of rice at Anyiko Rice Milling is performed. The staple food of the village's inhabitants is maize; this is as rice is mainly sold commercially, despite the village being the largest producer of locally consumed rice in Siaya County. Ujwang'a is home to prominent persons such as Kevin Alori, Raphael Alori, Oscar Lorna, Eric Masiga, Benerd Ongore, and Johnmark Odongo Msiko among others who are prominent business men in Kenya. The village has one private primary school(St. Paul's Digital Junior Academy); a hospital will open soon.

Siaya County
Populated places in Nyanza Province
Villages in Kenya
Populated places on Lake Victoria